Caudellia galapagosensis is a species of snout moth in the genus Caudellia. It was described by Bernard Landry and Herbert H. Neunzig in 2006 and is known from Ecuador's Galápagos Islands.

References

Moths described in 2006
Pyralidae of South America
Phycitinae
Moths of South America